Kerat Gol-e Sofla (also Romanized as Kerat Gol-e Soflá; also known as Kerat Gol) is a village in Khanmirza Rural District, Khanmirza District, Lordegan County, Chaharmahal and Bakhtiari Province, Iran. At the 2006 census, its population was 1,151, in 210 families.

References 

Populated places in Lordegan County